Goran Skeledžić (born 7 October 1969) is a Croatian football manager and former player.

Club career
Skeledžić played as forward, he started playing with Croatian side NK Osijek in the Yugoslav First League between 1988 and 1991. Next he moved to Serbian side FK Spartak Subotica and played with them in the First League of FR Yugoslavia. Next he moved to Germany where he played four seasons with Kickers Offenbach between 1994 and 1998. Between 1998 and 2002 he had one-year spells with SV Darmstadt 98, Dynamo Dresden, KSV Klein-Karben and TSF Usingen.

After retiring, Skeledžić became a coach.

References

External links
 Goran Skeledžić at German Football Association official website

1969 births
Living people
Association football forwards
Yugoslav footballers
Croatian footballers
NK Osijek players
FK Spartak Subotica players
Kickers Offenbach players
SV Darmstadt 98 players
Dynamo Dresden players
Yugoslav First League players
Croatian expatriate footballers
Expatriate footballers in Serbia and Montenegro
Croatian expatriate sportspeople in Serbia and Montenegro
Expatriate footballers in Germany
Croatian expatriate sportspeople in Germany
Croatian football managers
Croatian expatriate football managers
Expatriate football managers in Germany